The New One-Armed Swordsman is a 1971 Hong Kong wuxia film directed by Chang Cheh and produced by the Shaw Brothers Studio, starring David Chiang. Chiang replaced Jimmy Wang, the star of the two preceding films in the series, The One-Armed Swordsman and Return of the One-Armed Swordsman.

Cast
David Chiang as Lei Li of Han Dynasty
Ti Lung as Feng Junjie / Hero Fung
Lee Ching as Ba Jiao
Ku Feng as Long Yizhi / Lung Er Zi
Chan Sing as Chief Chan Chun Nam
Wang Chung as Tiger Mansion Leader Jin Fen
Liu Kang as Tiger Mansion Leader Jin Yi
Huang Pei-Chih as Tiger Mansion Leader Chen Jie
Wang Kuang-Yu as Tiger Mansion Leader Fan Yun He
Wong Ching-Ho as Boss Li
Shum Lo as Blacksmith Ba
Cheng Lei as Chieftain Ho Wai

Release
The New One-Armed Swordsman was distributed in Hong Kong on February 7, 1971.

Guo Tinghong won the award for Best Editing at the 9th 1971 Taiwan Golden Horse Awards.

Reception

Box office
It grossed a total of 1,596,530 domestically. Overseas in France, the film sold 564,061 tickets upon release in 1973, making it the year's 64th highest-grossing film in France.

Critical response
From contemporary reviews, Tony Rayns of the Monthly Film Bulletin reviewed an 86-minute version of the film. Rayns noted the introductory scene involving a severed limb decaying in a tree set "an uncharacteristically Gothic tone for this Shaw production; and the tone is maintained by the sombre production design, the under-lit interiors and the setting of several key scenes at night." Rayns found that "despite these distinctive inflections The New One-Armed Swordsman is rather poorly directed and photographed (with a Michael Winner-like reliance on 'dramatic' zooms), but the genre is strong enough to withstand the handicap and heroic fantasy wins out."

References

External links

1971 films
1971 martial arts films
Hong Kong martial arts films
1970s martial arts films
Mandarin-language films
Shaw Brothers Studio films
Wuxia films
Films directed by Chang Cheh
Hong Kong sequel films
1970s Hong Kong films